Prime time is the block of television programming during the middle of the evening.

Prime Time may also refer to:

Literature
 Prime Time, a novel by Joan Collins
 Prime Time (Doctor Who), a Doctor Who Past Doctor Adventures novel

Music
Prime Time (band), a group formed by Ornette Coleman

Albums
 Prime Time (Count Basie album)
 Prime Time (Deion Sanders album)
 Prime Time (Don McLean album)
 Prime Time (FireHouse album)
 Prime Time, by Tony Orlando and Dawn

Songs
 "PrimeTime" (song), by Janelle Monáe 
 "Prime Time", by The Alan Parsons Project from Ammonia Avenue
 "Prime Time", by FireHouse from Prime Time
 "Prime Time", by Haircut 100 from Paint and Paint
 "Prime Time", by The Tubes from Remote Control
 "Primetime", by Jay-Z and Kanye West from Watch the Throne

Radio
 PrimeTime Radio, a British radio station
 Prime Time (radio program), a Canadian radio program

Sport
 Primetime (TV channel), a pay-per-view boxing channel
 Primetime (football player), Deion Sanders
 Primetime (wrestler), Elix Skipper

Film and television
 Prime Time (film), a 2021 Polish drama thriller film
 Prime Time (Australian TV series), a 1986–1987 Australian soap opera/drama television series that aired on Nine Network
 Prime Time (Canadian TV program), a 1974–1975 Canadian current affairs television program that aired on CBC
 Prime Time (Irish TV programme), an Irish current affairs television programme that has aired on RTÉ One since 1992
 Primetime (American TV program), a 1989–2012 American news magazine television program that aired on ABC
 CBC Prime Time News, a Canadian television news programme
 Primetime (Cartoon Network), a 2001 Cartoon Network programming block
 UWN Primetime Live, a professional wrestling series

Other
 Prime Time, a beer produced by Asahi Breweries, Japan